Phyllonorycter intermixta is a moth of the family Gracillariidae. It is known from Québec in Canada and Connecticut, Ohio, Rhode Island and Vermont in the United States.

The larvae feed on Corylus americana. They mine the leaves of their host plant. The mine has the form of a rather large, tentiform mine between two veins. Most of the parenchyma is consumed, with only a few patches in the center remaining.

References

intermixta
Moths of North America

Lepidoptera of Canada
Lepidoptera of the United States
Leaf miners
Moths described in 1930
Taxa named by Annette Frances Braun